Taylor Anderson is an author, historical artillery and firearm expert, re-enactor, and former history professor. Anderson has also written several short stories in the same fictional universe.

Anderson served as a weapons consultant to various media organizations. In 1999, he owned three cannons which he had used for Civil War re-enactments and manufacture 19th century firearms. He served as a weapons expert for the 2004 movie The Alamo.

In May 2020, Anderson announced that Winds of Wrath would be the final book in the Destroyermen series and that he has started on a new writing project. The first book of his Artillerymen series, a prequel to Destroyermen, will be released in September 2021.

Education
Anderson received a bachelor of arts and master of arts in history from Tarleton State University. He taught American history for one academic year at Tarleton from 1991 to 1992.

Bibliography

Destroyermen

Destroyermen is a series of 15 novels and 2 short stories, written from 2008 to 2020, telling the saga of the men of two United States Wickes-class destroyers that gets transported in March 1942 to an alternate Earth in which dinosaurs evolved into a dominant sentient life form.

Novels

Short stories
 "Through the Squall" in the anthology To Slip the Surly Bonds (The Phases of Mars series) (September 2019) by Chris Kennedy and James Young, 
 "An Orderly Withdrawal" in the anthology Trouble in the Wind (The Phases of Mars series) (December 2019) by Chris Kennedy and James Young,

Artillerymen

Artillerymen is a new series that Anderson began writing in 2021 which tells the story of a group of unassigned American replacement soldiers who were traveling on several chartered transport ships in 1847 bound for Veracruz to reinforce U.S. General Winfield Scott's army in his march inland to capture Mexico City during the Mexican-American War when their ships was mysteriously transported to the same alternate Earth as the Destroyermen, but a century before the Destroyermen's arrival. These people became the founders of the New United States (NUS) mentioned in the Destroyermen series.

Novels

Reception and literary significance
Several of his books sold well enough to be included on various best selling book lists. Firestorm was listed on the New York Times Best Seller list for hardcover fiction for one week in October 2011 and Iron Gray Sea was listed on the New York Times Best Seller list for hardcover fiction for one week in July 2012. Iron Gray Sea was listed on the USA Today Best-Selling Books list during a single week in July 2012.

Critical studies and reviews of Anderson's work
''Straits of Hell

Interviews

Audio

Written

See also
 William Dufris

References

External links
 
 
 
 Taylor Anderson at Penguin Randomhouse

Living people
Military science fiction writers
Year of birth missing (living people)
American male novelists
Destroyermen and Artillerymen